The following is a list of winners of the Golden Calf for best script at the NFF. This category was awarded since 1999.

 2022 Do Not Hesitate - Jolein Laarman
 2021 The Judgement - Bert Bouma & Sander Burger
 2020 Romy's Salon - Tamara Bos
 2019 About That Life - Jeroen Scholten van Aschat & Shady El-Hamus
 2018 In Blue - Jaap van Heusden & Jan Willem den Bok
 2017 Bram Fischer - Jean van de Velde
 2016 The Paradise Suite - Joost van Ginkel
 2015 Son of Mine - Gustaaf Peek
 2014 How To Avoid Everything - Anne Barnhoorn
 2013 Borgman - Alex van Warmerdam
 2012 Plan C - Max Porcelijn
 2011 Brownian Movement - Nanouk Leopold
 2010 Joy - Helena van der Meulen
 2009 The Last Days of Emma Blank - Alex van Warmerdam
 2008 Het zusje van Katia (Katia's Sister) - Jan Eilander & Jolein Laarman
 2007 Nightwatching - Peter Greenaway 
 2006 Ober - Alex van Warmerdam
 2005 Het Paard van Sinterklaas - Tamara Bos
 2004 Ellis In Glamourland - Mischa Alexander
 2003 Van God Los - Pieter Kuijpers & Paul Jan Nelissen
 2002 The Discovery of Heaven - Edwin de Vries
 2001 Met Grote Blijdschap - Lodewijk Crijns en Kim van Kooten
 2000 Lek - Jean van de Velde & Simon de Waal
 1999 Missing Link - Ger Poppelaars & Timo Veldkamp

References

External links
 NFF Website

Best Script
Screenwriting awards for film